is a passenger railway station located in the town of Misaki, Sennan District, Osaka Prefecture, Japan, operated by the private railway operator Nankai Electric Railway. It has the station number "NK41-2".

Lines

Layout
The station consists of one side platform serving a single bi-directional track. The station is unattended.

Adjacent stations

History
Fukekō Station opened on November 3, 1948.

Passenger statistics
In fiscal 2019, the station was used by an average of 698 passengers daily.

Surrounding area
 Misaki Town Office

See also
 List of railway stations in Japan

References

External links

  

Railway stations in Japan opened in 1948
Railway stations in Osaka Prefecture
Misaki, Osaka